Echols County is a county located in the southeastern part of the U.S. state of Georgia. As of the 2020 census, the population was 3,697. The county seat is Statenville. Statenville is a disincorporated municipality.  Echols and Webster counties are the only two counties in Georgia to currently have no incorporated municipalities. The county was established in 1858 and named in honor of Robert Milner Echols (1798–1847).

Echols County is part of the Valdosta, GA Metropolitan Statistical Area.

History
On December 13, 1858, the Georgia General Assembly passed a bill establishing Echols County from a south-eastern section of Lowndes County and a south-western section Clinch County. The original borders of the county were a line from the mouth of the Suwanoochee Creek directly south to the state line, then along the state line, then north to the junction of Grand Bay Creek and Mud Swamp, then up the course of Grand Bay Creek to Carter's Ford, then a direct line to where Cow's Creek enters the Alapaha River, then up the creek to Griffins' Mill, then a direct line to Jack's Fort on Suwanoochee Creek, and then down Suwanoochee Creek to its mouth. With the exception of some minor adjustments of the border Echols shares with Lowndes and the loss of a thin strip to Florida following Florida v. Georgia, the borders of Echols County has changed little since its establishment. Statenville was declared the county seat in 1859.

At the time of the 1860 census, Echols County had a white population of 1,177, with 314 slaves, and no free people of color.

Echols County became notable as it has served as a place of banishment for many of Georgia's criminals. As the Georgia State Constitution forbids banishment beyond the borders of the state, officials instead ban the offender from 158 of Georgia's 159 counties, with Echols remaining as their only option. Few criminals have been documented as actually moving to Echols. This is because almost all banished criminals choose to leave the state instead of moving to Echols County.

Banishment, including 158-county banishment, has repeatedly been upheld by Georgia courts. The first case when banishment was upheld was in the 1974 case State v Collett, when the Georgia Supreme Court upheld the banishment of a drug dealer from seven counties. The most recent time banishment was upheld, in 2011, the Georgia Supreme Court ruled it was constitutional to banish David Nathan Thompson (a mentally ill man who was convicted of firing a gun into a home, although no one was injured) from all but one county in Georgia.

Geography
The county contains a notable swamp, Whitehead Bay.

The western half of Echols County is located in the Alapaha River sub-basin of the Suwannee River basin. The eastern half of the county, from well east of Statenville to just west of Fargo, is located in the Upper Suwannee River sub-basin of the same Suwannee River basin.

Major highways

  U.S. Route 41
  U.S. Route 129
  U.S. Route 441
    State Route 7
   State Route 11
   State Route 89
   State Route 94
  State Route 135
  State Route 187
  State Route 376

Major waterways
 Alapaha River
 Alapahoochee River
 Grand Bay Creek (known in the 1800s as Irwin's River and later as Irwin's Creek)
 Suwannee River
 Suwanoochee Creek

Railways
 Georgia Southern and Florida Railway
 Seaboard Coast Line Railroad
 Plant System (now part of CSX)
 Statenville Railway (Defunct, it was used from 1910 to 1924. It ran from Statenville to Haylow, Georgia)

Adjacent counties
 Clinch County – northeast
 Columbia County, Florida – southeast
 Hamilton County, Florida – south
 Lowndes County – west
 Lanier County – north

Demographics

2000 census
As of the census of 2000, there were 3,754 people, 1,264 households, and 936 families living in the county. The population density was 9 people per square mile (4/km2). There were 1,482 housing units at an average density of 4 per square mile (1/km2). The racial makeup of the county was 77.1% White, 6.9% Black or African American, 1.2% Native American, 0.1% Asian, <0.1% Pacific Islander, 13.7% from other races, and 1.0% from two or more races. 19.7% of the population were Hispanic or Latino of any race.

There were 1,264 households, out of which 38.1% had children under the age of 18 living with them, 58.6% were married couples living together, 10.8% had a female householder with no husband present, and 25.9% were non-families. 18.7% of all households were made up of individuals, and 9.1% had someone living alone who was 65 years of age or older. The average household size was 2.97 and the average family size was 3.26.

In the county the population has a demographically large age range with 29.3% under the age of 18, 12.5% from 18 to 24, 30.8% from 25 to 44, 18.3% from 45 to 64, and 9.1% who were 65 years of age or older. The median age was 30 years. For every 100 females there were 116.1 males. For every 100 females age 18 and over, there were 114.6 males.

The median income for a household in the county was $25,851, and the median income for a family was $27,700. Males had a median income of $24,650 versus $17,297 for females. The per capita income for the county was $15,727. 28.7% of the population and 22.3% of families were below the poverty line. Out of the total people living in poverty, 33.1% are under the age of 18 and 29.8% are 65 or older.

2010 census
As of the 2010 United States Census, there were 4,034 people, 1,329 households, and 1,029 families living in the county. The racial makeup of the county was 74.9% white, 4.2% black or African American, 1.8% American Indian, 0.3% Asian, 15.8% from other races, and 2.8% from two or more races. Those of Hispanic or Latino origin made up 29.3% of the population. In terms of ancestry, 11.8% were German, 8.6% were Irish, 5.8% were American, and 5.3% were English.

Of the 1,329 households, 43.6% had children under the age of 18 living with them, 55.8% were married couples living together, 14.0% had a female householder with no husband present, 22.6% were non-families, and 16.7% of all households were made up of individuals. The average household size was 3.04 and the average family size was 3.33. The median age was 31.4 years.

The median income for a household in the county was $32,390 and the median income for a family was $33,664. Males had a median income of $28,613 versus $20,208 for females. The per capita income for the county was $14,201. About 21.4% of families and 32.1% of the population were below the poverty line, including 41.8% of those under age 18 and 6.1% of those age 65 or over.

2020 census

As of the 2020 United States Census, there were 3,697 people, 1,561 households, and 1,097 families residing in the county.

Education

Echols County School District operates public schools.

Communities
 Fruitland
 Statenville (county seat)
 Howell
 Needmore
 Tarver (formerly Statenville Station and Huckleberry)

Politics

See also

 National Register of Historic Places listings in Echols County, Georgia

 State of Georgia v. Allison
List of counties in Georgia

Notes

References

External links
 Echols County historical marker
 Wayfare or Cow Creek Church historical marker

 
1858 establishments in Georgia (U.S. state)
Georgia (U.S. state) counties
Valdosta metropolitan area counties
Populated places established in 1858